La Victoria is a city in the state of Aragua in Venezuela.

It is famous for the independence battle of 12 February 1814, the Battle of La Victoria, where José Félix Ribas led a young and inexperienced army that succeeded in halting the royalist troops of José Tomás Boves at La Victoria. Venezuela celebrates "Youth Day" every 12 February in La Victoria, with a ceremony usually presided over by the President of the Republic.

Notable people
 

Wilfred Iván Ojeda (1955–2011), journalist and politician

References

Cities in Aragua